New Grass Revival is the most commonly used title of an album recorded and released in 1972 by the progressive bluegrass band New Grass Revival on the Starday label. This album was also released under the titles The Arrival of the New Grass Revival and Today's Bluegrass.

The New Grass Revival released another album titled New Grass Revival in 1986; due to personnel changes, only Sam Bush was on both.

Track listing
 "Pennies In My Pocket" (Ebo Walker)
 "Cold Sailor" (Steve Brines, Jim Smoak)
 "I Wish I Said (I Love You One More Time)" (Brines, Sam Bush)
 "Prince of Peace" (Leon Russell)
 "Ginseng Sullivan" (Norman Blake)
 "Whisper My Name" (Walker)
 "Great Balls of Fire" (Jerry Lee Lewis)
 "Lonesome Fiddle Blues" (Vassar Clements)
 "Body & Soul" (Virginia Stauffer)
 "With Care From Someone" (Gene Clark, Bernie Leadon, Doug Dillard)

Personnel 
 Sam Bush - mandolin, fiddle
 Courtney Johnson - banjo
 Curtis Burch - guitar, Dobro
 Ebo Walker - upright bass

New Grass Revival albums
1972 debut albums